The 1989–90 Michigan Wolverines men's basketball team represented the University of Michigan in intercollegiate college basketball during the 1989–90 season. The team played its home games in the Crisler Arena in Ann Arbor, Michigan, and was a member of the Big Ten Conference.   Head coach Steve Fisher led the team to a third-place finish in the Big Ten Conference.  The team earned the number three seed in the 1990 NCAA Division I men's basketball tournament. For the third consecutive year, the team was ranked every week of the season in the AP Poll, which expanded from a top twenty poll to a top twenty-five poll that year. It began the season at number four, ended at number thirteen and peaked at number three. and it ended the season ranked fifteenth in the final UPI Coaches' Poll.

Terry Mills and Rumeal Robinson served as team co-captains and shared team co-MVP honors.  The team's leading scorers were Robinson (575 points), Mills (562 points), and Loy Vaught (480 points).  The leading rebounders were Vaught (346), Mills (247), and Robinson (127).

Robinson earned consensus All-American recognition.

The team established the current Big Ten Conference single-game field goals made record against Iowa on March 10, 1990, when it made 55. The team earned numerous conference statistical championships. Loy Vaught won the rebounding championship for conference games with a 10.7 average and all games with an 11.2 average, while Robinson won the assists title for all games.  This was the first year that the conference recognized both conference games and all games statistical champions.

Vaught also set the Michigan career field goal percentage record at 67.1%.  The record would stand until 1998.   On March 8, 1990, against Wisconsin, the team tied the school's February 21, 1987, single-game free throw percentage record by making all fifteen of its free throws, a mark that has only been outdone by the March 2, 2002 16-for-16 performance. Robinson set the current school career assist average of 5.75 per game, surpassing Gary Grant's 1988 mark.  Loy Vaught ended his career with 135 games played, which surpassed Glen Rice's 1989 school record of 134 games to establish the record. In 2012, Stu Douglass finished his career with 136 games.
 
In the 64-team NCAA Division I men's basketball tournament, number three seeded Michigan advanced one round by defeating the fourteen-seeded Illinois State 76–70 before losing to the eleven-seeded Loyola Marymount 149–115.  The March 18, 1990 264-point contest with Loyola Marymount stands as the highest scoring single game in NCAA tournament history.  It is also the highest combined total in Michigan history.

Roster

Regular season

Rankings

Team players drafted into the NBA
Five players from this team were selected in the NBA draft.

See also
Michigan Wolverines men's basketball
1990 NCAA Division I men's basketball tournament
NCAA Men's Division I tournament bids by school
NCAA Men's Division I tournament bids by school and conference
NCAA Division I men's basketball tournament all-time team records

References

Michigan Wolverines men's basketball seasons
Michigan
Michigan
Michigan
1989 in sports in Michigan